The 1981–82 Liga Gimel season saw 107 clubs competing in 8 regional divisions for promotion to Liga Bet.

Hapoel Kafr Sumei, Hapoel Bnei Tamra, Beitar al-Amal Nazareth, Hapoel Baqa al-Gharbiyye, Beitar Hod HaSharon, Beitar Beit Dagan, Maccabi Kiryat Ekron and Beitar Kiryat Gat won their regional divisions and promoted to Liga Bet.

Galilee Division

Bay Division

Haifa Division

Samaria Division

Sharon Division

Dan Division

Central Division

South Division

See also
1981–82 Liga Leumit
1981–82 Liga Artzit
1981–82 Liga Alef
1981–82 Liga Bet

References
Galilee champion was not crowned because of an accident (Page 2) Amos Avital, Hadshot HaSport, 19 May 1982, archive.football.co.il 
Kafr Sumei to Liga Bet (Page 4) Yosef Glazer, Hadshot HaSport, 25 July 1982, archive.football.co.il 

Liga Gimel seasons
5